Manuel de Castro González, better known as Hándicap (9 August 1885 – 27 August 1944), was a Spanish sports journalist, football executive, manager, referee, and politician. He was one of the most important figures in the amateur beginnings of football in Vigo, being noted for his prominent role in promoting football in the city and as the fundamental head behind the foundation of Celta de Vigo in 1923.

As a football executive, he held the presidency of the Galician Football Federation. As a coach, he managed both the Spain national team in 10 games between 1921 and 1927, as well as the Galicia national team. And as a referee, he founded the College of Arbitrators of Galicia. He also promoted athletics, of which he also served as president of the Galician Athletics Federation. He was a defensor of the idea of "complete athletes", people who dedicated themselves to more than one modality.

Early years 
Born in Vigo, he was one of the pioneers who began playing football in Vigo on the Malecón field in the early years of the 20th century. He began his journalist career as an editor for the Sprint newspaper, and already in 1909, he wrote in the magazine Letras y Deporte, the first sports magazine in Galicia, later moving on to Faro de Vigo (1912–1930), in which he became a fervent disseminator of sporting activity, signing his articles under the pseudonym Hándicap. He is thus considered "the dean" of sports reporters in Vigo. He also wrote for Vida Deportiva, the magazine where the first campaign in favor of building a stadium in Vigo appeared.

Managerial career 
In 1921 he began to carry out the functions of coach of the Spain national team, as part of a Selection Committee of Spain made up of Julián Ruete and José Berraondo, and the first match this Committee oversaw was a friendly against Belgium 9 October 1921, which was Spain's first-ever game after the Olympics as well as their first-ever game on home soil. This Committee was formed and reformed numerous times in its history, also partnering with the likes of Ezequiel Montero and Ricardo Cabot in 1925–27. He oversaw a total of 10 games, winning 9 of them, which results in a ratio of 0.90 wins per game, a national record still unmatched. During his time at the head of the national team he would develop a great friendship with Ricardo Zamora. In addition to the Spanish team, he also managed the Galician national team on numerous occasions, in a time when most of the team was made up of Celta players.

Legend of the origin of the Furia Roja 
He was at the Antwerp, Paris, and Amsterdam Olympic Games and dedicated two books to the first two. On 1 September 1920, Spain faced Sweden in the quarter-finals of the 1920 Summer Olympics, and they were trailing 0–1 when the captain, José María Belauste, launched a voice to teammate Sabino Bilbao that was picked up in the chronicles by the only Spanish journalist present at the match, Hándicap, who thus collected one of the most mythical phrases in the history of Spanish football: "¡A mí el pelotón, Sabino, que los arrollo!" ("Send me that ball, Sabino, I'll crush them!" in Spanish). And that is how it went, with Belauste scoring the equalizer, thus immortalizing this phrase that was subsequently viewed as the reason why the national team was dubbed Furia Roja (Spanish Fury).

Celta Vigo
He began to work on the idea in the mid-1910s, which would fail in his first attempt in 1915, but this did not discourage him, and in his second attempt in 1923, he reached an agreement between the two sides; taking advantage of the fact that the Galician national team, a combination of the best players from Vigo, had reached the final of the 1922–23 Prince of Asturias Cup after beating the likes of the Centro team (a Castile/Madrid XI) by a score of 4–1, and despite losing the final, the Galicia fans were very pleased with the team's performance in the competition, thus welcoming with tremendous enthusiasm the idea proposed by Manuel de Castro, and hence, on 23 August 1923, Celta de Vigo was born.

Later life
In 1924, with the help of his brother, the former football player and athlete Fernando de Castro, he founded the Galician Athletics Federation. In the following years, he would limit his activity to refereeing, even founding the Galician College of Arbitrators.

Death

On 27 August 1944, he was "the victim of a tragic accident" when he was run over by a train in the vicinity of the Eijo Garay Gardens when he was leaving an exhibition. His death caused deep sorrow throughout the footballing world, where Hándicap enjoyed great prestige at a local, regional and national level.

Legacy
A bust of him, sculpted by Rafael Álvarez Borrás in 1946, has been located on the street that bears his name in front of the Balaídos stadium since 20 May 1956.

In 2011, the "Manuel de Castro" award was established to reward the best Celta player of the calendar year, election made by vote among the entire Celta environment (fans, media, players, etc).

References 

1885 births
1944 deaths
Spanish footballers
Footballers from Vigo
Spanish football managers
RC Celta de Vigo managers
Spain national football team managers
Spanish sports journalists
Spanish football referees